M. Subhadra Nair is an Indian gynaecologist, medical teacher and social worker, reportedly credited to have assisted over 50,000 child births. The Government of India honoured her, in 2014, with the Padma Shri, the fourth highest civilian award, for her services to the field of medicine, the first gynaecologist to receive the Padma award.

Biography

Subhadra Nair was born on 21 February 1929 at Irinjalakuda, Thrissur, in the south Indian state of Kerala to Krishnan Kutty Menon and Madhavi Amma, one of the pioneer lady doctors in India, as the sister of two elder brothers and one elder sister. Madhavi Amma, a follower of Mahatma Gandhi and a freedom fighter, was a strict disciplinarian and a busy doctor dues to which the young Subhadra was brought up by her maternal aunt.

Subhadra started her schooling at an early age of 3 at the local school in Irinjalakuda and passed matriculation before she turned 14. Madras University, under which Irinjalakuda fell, had minimum age requirement for college studies and Subhadara, being under age, had to move to Travancore University area for college studies. As such, she joined Union Christian College, Aluva and passed the Pre University Course. Again, age prevented her to join a medical course directly, which only Madras University offered and Subhadra joined Maharajas College, Ernakulam to complete her BSc degree.

The medical career of her mother had influenced Subhadra and she had already made up her mind to pursue a career in medicine. Accordingly, in 1947, she moved to Madras, where her eldest brother, Vishwanatha Menon was already a practising diabetologist, to join Madras Medical College from where she passed her MBBS. Though she had opportunities to start medical practice in Madras, along with her brother, Subhadra decided against it and returned to Kerala.

Her career started as the assistant surgeon at the Sree Avittam Thirunal Hospital for women and children in Thiruvananthapuram, part of the Government Medical College, Thiruvananthapuram which was in its infancy at that time. As the Medical College grew, Subhadra joined the faculty as a tutor. To further her teaching career, which required a post graduate degree to enter the mainstream teaching profession, she secured a postgraduate degree with specialisation in gynecology and obstetrics from Patna and Madras universities and soon rose up the ranks. Subhadra Nair retired from the Government service in 1984, as the Head of the Department of Gynecology and Obstetrics.

Nair was married to Gopalakrishnan Nair, a district superintendent with the Kerala Police, who has since died leaving behind two daughters, Asha Nair and Shanthi Nair. Asha Nair is settled in the UK while the younger daughter remains in Thiruvananthapuram. After retiring from the government service, Subhadra joined Cosmopolitan Hospital, Thiruvananthapuram as consultant surgeon of gynecology, when the hospital was a small-time setup. The hospital has now developed into a multi-speciality hospital.

Subhadra Nair lives in Pattom, Thiruvananthapuram, continuing her work as the chairman and the senior consultant of gynecology at the Cosmopolitan Hospital.

Career graph

 Assistant surgeon – Sree Avittam Thirunal hospital for women and children
 Tutor – Government Medical College, Thiruvananthapuram
 Lecturer – Government Medical College, Thiruvananthapuram
 Assistant professor – Government Medical College, Thiruvananthapuram
 Professor – Government Medical College, Thiruvananthapuram
 Director and head of the Department of Gynecology – Government Medical College, Thiruvananthapuram
 Consultant surgeon – Cosmopolitan Hospital, Thiruvananthapuram
 Senior consultant surgeon – Cosmopolitan Hospital, Thiruvananthapuram
 Chairman – Cosmopolitan Hospital, Thiruvananthapuram

Social service
After retirement from government service, Subhadra Nair started working with Abhaya, a charitable organisation engaged in the support service to destitute people. Later, she was attracted to the activities of the Sri Sathya Sai Orphanage Trust, an NGO operating in Thiruvananthapuram and started devoting her attention to the social activities of the Trust.

At Sai Trust, she, along with the founding members, were able to set up a Saigramam, a village to provide shelter and support to the needy. Subhadra, personally stood guarantee for obtaining a bank loan for the construction of the village. The project has since grown to provide social, educational and medical support to a large section of people through Sainiketan (Children's home), Sayoojyam (Old age home), Sathya Sai Vidya Mandir (School), Sai Narayanalayam (Public kitchen), Navajeevanam Free Dialysis Unit and Sai Care Home (centre for differently gifted people). The organisation claims they have provided over 200,000 free dialysis to people from financially poor background

Subhadra, a trustee of the Saigramam from its inception, is serving as its acting Chairperson. She frequently gives lectures on the subject of gynaecology at various platforms. She has also been involved in the publication of a book on infertility.

Awards and recognitions
 Padma Shri – Government of India – 2014
 Fellowship – Commonwealth
 Fellowship – World Health Organization

Controversy
In 1990, Shibu Thomas and Geetha Shibu Thomas, parents of Baby Naveen, approached the Kerala State Consumer Disputes Redressal Commission alleging medical negligence on the part of the Cosmopolitan Hospital and the doctors. Baby Naveen was reported to have sustained Birth asphyxia (lack of oxygen), which consequently resulted in Hypoxic-ischemic encephalopathy, but, the commission dismissed the petition citing lack of evidence. The petitioners approached the National Consumer Disputes Redressal Commission with an appeal against the state body's verdict on which the appellate authority allowed a compensation of  1.35 million with interest, to be paid jointly by the hospital and the doctors. Subhadra, who had to pay approximately 500,000, however, maintained that there was no negligence on the part of the doctors.

References

External links
 
 
 
 

1929 births
Living people
Recipients of the Padma Shri in medicine
Indian gynaecologists
20th-century Indian medical doctors
Indian medical academics
People from Irinjalakuda
Malayali people
Indian obstetricians
20th-century Indian women scientists
Indian women educational theorists
Scientists from Kerala
Social workers
20th-century Indian educational theorists
Women scientists from Kerala
Social workers from Kerala
Women educators from Kerala
Educators from Kerala
20th-century women educators